The Epsom Cup (Japanese エプソムカップ) is a Grade 3 Handicap horse race for Thoroughbreds aged three and over, run in June over a distance of 1800 metres at Tokyo Racecourse.

It was first run in 1984 and has held Grade 3 status ever since.

Winners since 1984

See also
 Horse racing in Japan
 List of Japanese flat horse races

References

Turf races in Japan
1984 establishments in Japan
Recurring sporting events established in 1984